Luljeta Bitri (born June 27, 1976), better known by her stage name Luli Bitri, is an Albanian actress, voice actress, director, and producer.

Early life
Luli Bitri was born in Lushnjë, Albania and grew up in Tirana. She began to study medicine, but her passion for art made her to abandon medicine after the first year. Luli Bitri studied Drama in Fine Arts Academy in Tirana, Albania, gaining a Diploma in Professional Acting in 2004. Bitri starred in many short and feature films and theatre plays whilst a student there. She began her international career with the 2007 film Father and Godfather, directed by Dhimitër Anagnosti, the 2009 film Alive! directed by Artan Minarolli, in 2011 film Amnesty, directed by Bujar Alimani. With the last two films she entered in the List of Albanian submissions for the Academy Award for Best Foreign Language Film in 2009 and 2011.
In 2018 she starred in the film Holy Boom, directed by Maria Lafi.

Career
Bitri came to international prominence for her portrayal of Elsa in Bujar Alimani's Amnesty in which she played the title role to great acclaim and received international media attention. The film was awarded in Berlinale International Forum 2011 (C.I.C.A.E. Prize). In the same year Bitri was nominated for her role, in the Best Actress category, at the Sarajevo Film Festival and at the Copenhagen International Film Festival, Lecce European Film Festival (Cineuropa, Fipresci, Jury Prize), Jerusalem Film Festival and Prishtina International Film Festival in Kosovo. Amnesty is her third feature.

Filmography

Film

Theatre

Voice acting

Awards and nominations

Notes

References
Luli Bitri Showreel
Frankfurter Allgemeine
Berlino 2011 Amnesty Close - Up
Cineuropa Film Focus
Berlin Film Festival
The Academy Awards
Museum of Modern Art (New York)
Shekulli
Un bacio sul cuore
https://cinando.com/en/Film/winter_fireflies_292617/Detail
https://www.inkasfilms.com/movie/holly-boom/
https://www.imdb.com/title/tt4557810/
https://www.imdb.com/title/tt6842558/
https://www.screendaily.com/reviews/open-door-sarajevo-review/5142082.article
https://films.sff.ba/en/detail/?film=Open-Door
https://mia.mk/2019/09/open-door-film-premieres-at-manaki-brothers-film-festival/?lang=en

External links 

Allocine.fr

Amnesty Justflick.com
Lajme.gen.al
Akademiakult.com

1976 births
Albanian actresses
Albanian film actresses
Albanian stage actresses
Albanian voice actresses
Albanian film producers
Albanian film directors
21st-century Albanian actresses
People from Lushnjë
People from Tirana
Living people